Dublovice is a municipality and village in Příbram District in the Central Bohemian Region of the Czech Republic. It has about 1,100 inhabitants.

Administrative parts
Villages of Břekova Lhota, Chramosty, Líchovy and Zvírotice are administrative parts of Dublovice.

References

Villages in Příbram District